John Goundry Holburn (12 February 1843 – 23 January 1899) was a Scottish politician and a member of parliament for North West Lanarkshire from 1895 to 1899.

Holburn was born 12 April 1843 the son of Thomas Holburn of Durham, he was self-educated and became a tinplate-worker. Between 1871 and 1875 he was President of the Edinburgh and Leith Trades Council and from 1890 to 1895 a member of Leith Town Council. In the 1895 general election Holburn was elected to represent North West Lanarkshire with a majority of only 97. He died in office on 25 January 1899.

References

External links
 

1843 births
1899 deaths
Scottish Liberal Party MPs
Members of the Parliament of the United Kingdom for Scottish constituencies
UK MPs 1895–1900
People from Leith
Scottish Liberal Party councillors
Politicians from Edinburgh